Oaksville is a hamlet west of Cooperstown on conjoined NY-28/NY-80, in the Town of Otsego, New York, in Otsego County, New York, United States. Oaks Creek flows south through the hamlet.

History
Oaksville was once served by the Southern New York Railroad and the site of one of the stations. Located in Oaksville was the cotton mill called the Otsego Print-works, which was built by Russell Williams in 1830.

References

Hamlets in Otsego County, New York